Hylocryptus was a genus of birds in the family Furnariidae. The AOU has merged the genus into Clibanornis.

Species
 Henna-capped foliage-gleaner, Hylocryptus rectirostris
 Henna-hooded foliage-gleaner, Hylocryptus erythrocephalus

Recent evidence suggests that another species, the Santa Marta foliage-gleaner, possibly also should be placed in this genus.

References

 
Bird genera
Taxonomy articles created by Polbot
Obsolete bird taxa